Shahram Dabiri Oskuei (born 1960) is an Iranian politician, physician, sporting director, professor and former board of directors Iran Football Federation. He founded Dabiri Tabriz FSC in 1998. Dabiri FSC plays in the Iranian Futsal Super League, a professional futsal league competition for clubs located at the highest level of the Iranian futsal league system.

Dabiri is chairman of the Islamic City Council of Tabriz; he won with 105,157 votes. He is also dean of the faculty and professor of nuclear medicine at the Tabriz University of Medical Sciences.

References

External links
 Page of Dr. Dabiri in Islamic City Council of Tabriz
 Dabiri FSC Website

1960 births
Living people
People from Tabriz
Iranian sports executives and administrators
Tabriz University of Medical Sciences alumni
University of Tehran alumni
Academic staff of Tabriz University of Medical Sciences
Iranian city councillors